"Enemy" is a song by American rock band Sevendust and the lead single from their fourth album, Seasons. It was released on August 26, 2003 with an accompanying music video.

Background and meaning
"Enemy" was written and largely sung by drummer Morgan Rose, who at the time was married to former Coal Chamber bassist Rayna Foss-Rose. The song was written about Coal Chamber frontman Dez Fafara.

"That song is about the person in the world that I hate more than Saddam Hussein," Rose said. "It was good to be able to get that stuff off my chest because I was able to express myself without doing anything stupid that would get me in trouble." Guitarist John Connolly also noted, "Dez is just a piece of shit. He’s just one of those people where, he’s basically a bad person. There’s good people and bad people in this world, and he’s just, he wants to be a good person and he wants to act like a good person, but he’s really just a bad dude and he’s just looking out for himself."

Rose held such rancor for Fafara because of the way he allegedly treated Foss-Rose when Coal Chamber were together. "He's a horrible human being and he fucked my wife over real bad," he said. "But it turned out to be a really good song."

"Enemy" was originally called "Pez," a derogatory nickname Rose had for Fafara. "We called him that because I used to say, 'I want to take this dude's head and pull it back and rip his tongue out of his neck,'" Rose grumbled. It features such lines as, "Look at your face, look at your name/ Funny you're a loser with only yourself to blame," and "You want to be like me 'cause it's real/ So you steal on your way to fame."

In an interview, Lajon Witherspoon reported having since reconciled with Fafara, stating "oh, man, all that stuff was young, crazy, Morgan was married to Rayna, [and they since] got divorced. We grew up, man. Dez and I, we hang out with Devildriver and I think they’re one of the baddest bands as far as bringing it live. You can’t deny it; they drop it like it’s hot. I’m friends with those guys. I can’t wait to see Dez again. That whole silly stuff back in the day… It was crazy, but we went on, we were able to do a song and get our angst out. I think we’ve all grown up, we got kids now, and you know what?! That was just a page in our lives."

Appearances
"Enemy" was the official theme song for the WWE Unforgiven 2003 pay-per-view. The song also featured in horror film Evil Deeds. It also makes an appearance in the trailer for WWE SmackDown! Here Comes the Pain.

Music video
The music video for "Enemy" was directed by Adam Pollina, a former artist for the Marvel comic book X-Force, and features former WWE wrestler Chyna. It includes no band performance and solely depicts a violent yet comical plot. The video begins with a tall man named Romp and his accompanying dwarf manager, Chi Chi Gigante, who carries his championship belt, an Attitude Era WWE Championship. As they walk down a sidewalk busy with food vendors and breakdancers, they meet a muscular blond woman, named Lu Lu (Chyna), beating on a defenseless man in an alley. The two silently challenge Lu Lu to a fight before Chi Chi removes Romp's jacket to reveal he has no arms. Romp and Lu Lu face each other in a violent, bloody bout ending with a victorious Romp. The duo walk away with a caption reading "...to be continued." Artwork of the Sevendust band lineup, as seen on the Seasons album cover, is shown as the video comes to an end.

Another video for "Enemy" featuring the band in studio was included on the Seasons bonus DVD.

Chart position
The song peaked at number 10 on the Mainstream Rock charts, their first song to reach the top 10, and peaked at number 30 on the Modern Rock charts, their last song to crack the chart to date.

Singles
Billboard (North America)

References

Sevendust songs
2003 singles
Songs written by Butch Walker
Songs written by Morgan Rose
TVT Records singles
Song recordings produced by Butch Walker
2003 songs
Diss tracks